Park Jung-Sik (born 20 January 1988) is a South Korean footballer who plays as midfielder for FC Anyang in K League Challenge.

Career
He was selected by FC Anyang in 2013 K League draft.

References

External links 

1988 births
Living people
Association football midfielders
South Korean footballers
Goyang KB Kookmin Bank FC players
FC Anyang players
Korea National League players
K League 2 players